Christopher Gattelli is an American choreographer, performer and theatre director.

Early life and career
Gattelli grew up in Bristol, Pennsylvania. He started dancing at the age of 11 and is a "Star Search" Grand champion. As a performer, he appeared in How to Succeed in Business Without Really Trying (Revival) and the role of Pouncival in Cats.

Choreographer
Gattelli has choreographed several special benefit concerts, including Chess (2003), Hair (also co-director, Actor's Fund, 2004), and "Chance and Chemistry: A Centennial Celebration of Frank Loesser" (also directed, Actors Fund, October 2009).

His work as choreographer for Broadway includes Martin Short: Fame Becomes Me (2006), High Fidelity (2006), The Ritz (2007), Sunday in the Park with George (Revival, 2008), South Pacific (2008), 13 (2008), "Women On the Verge of a Nervous Breakdown," "Godspell," Newsies (2012), and the 2015 revival of The King and I.

His Off-Broadway choreographic work includes Adrift in Macao (2007, also Philadelphia, PA 2005), How to Save the World and Find True Love in 90 Minutes (also director, 2006), I Love You Because (2006), Altar Boyz (2005), tick, tick...BOOM, Dogfight and Bat Boy: The Musical (2001).  In regional theatre he is the choreographer for The Baker's Wife (Paper Mill Playhouse, Millburn, New Jersey, 2005), Tom Jones (2004), tick, tick...BOOM! (2004, also London Fringe, 2005), Me and My Girl, and O. Henry's Lovers (Goodspeed Opera House, 2003). He directed Jim Henson's Emmet Otter's Jug-Band Christmas at The Goodspeed Opera House, Connecticut in 2008, and choreographed Julie Andrews' The Great American Mousical there in 2012. His production of The Jungle Book played the Goodman Theatre and Huntington Theatre Company in 2013. He is the director of the musical spoof SILENCE! The Musical, which ran in 2005 at NYCFringe and is scheduled to open in London in January 2010. Other West End and London credits include South Pacific and Sunday In the Park With George. He is in charge of musical staging for Little Miss Sunshine.

He collaborated with Stephen Flaherty on the world premiere of In Your Arms, which he directed and choreographed for the New York Stage and Film's Powerhouse Theater at Vassar in 2014. He is directing and choreographing In Your Arms for a production at the Old Globe Theatre in September 2015.

Gattelli directed and choreographed the Spring 2014 lab of RKO's Top Hat in New York. This is a new version of the 2011 stage version that ran in London and the UK, and is being worked on by Gatelli and Chad Beguelin. The production "is still several seasons off", according to Gatelli in January 2017.

His choreography can also be seen in the Coen brothers feature Hail Caesar!.

He was the resident choreographer for The Rosie O'Donnell Show.

Awards
Gattelli was nominated for the Tony Award for Best Choreography for South Pacific and won the award in 2012 for Newsies. His Newsies choreography also won him the Outer Critics Circle Award. He won the Drama Desk Award, Outstanding Choreography for Altar Boyz. He won the Lucille Lortel Award for Outstanding Choreographer for Altar Boyz and Bat Boy: The Musical.

Personal life
He is openly gay.

References

External links

American choreographers
Living people
LGBT choreographers
Gay entertainers
Year of birth missing (living people)
Place of birth missing (living people)
21st-century LGBT people
Tony Award winners